WGGD-LD, virtual channel 15 (UHF digital channel 23), is a low-powered Daystar owned-and-operated television station serving Atlanta, Georgia, United States that is licensed to Gainesville. The station is owned by the Word of God Fellowship, as part of a duopoly with WDTA-LD (channel 35).

References

External links
Daystar network website

GGD-LD
Television channels and stations established in 2008
2008 establishments in Georgia (U.S. state)
Low-power television stations in the United States